Liocranum rupicola is a species of spider in the family Liocranidae. It is found in Europe and Russia, and was first described by Charles Athanase Walckenaer in 1830.

References

Corinnidae
Spiders described in 1830
Spiders of Europe
Spiders of Russia